Miluk, also known as Lower Coquille from its location, is one of two Coosan languages. It shares more than half of its vocabulary with Coos proper (Hanis), though these are not always obvious, and grammatical differences cause the two languages to look quite different. Miluk started being displaced by Athabascan in the late 18th century, and many Miluk shifted to Athabascan and Hanis.

Miluk was spoken around the lower Coquille River and the South Slough of Coos Bay. The name míluk is the endonym, derived from a village name. The last fully fluent speaker of Miluk was Annie Miner Peterson, who died in 1939. She knew both Miluk and Hanis, and made a number of recordings. Laura Hodgkiss Metcalf, who died in 1961, was the last functional speaker (her mother was Miluk), and was an informant to Morris Swadesh for his Penutian Vocabulary Survey.

Phonology

The consonant inventory of Miluk can be tabulated as follows, based on Doty (2012):

Stops are tenuis in syllable onsets before a vowel, and aspirated in syllable codas and before another consonant.

Vowel harmony occurs in Miluk, although sporadic.

Morphology
In Miluk, the possessive noun phrase precedes what is possessed.  The possessed noun takes no article but instead is marked with the oblique [tə]. Miluk has an inclusive and exclusive distinction when it comes to the dual possessive. In the first person dual inclusive, the words receive the circumfix s=nə-, while the first person dual exclusive receives the prefix nə-.

There are two articles in Miluk, kʷə and ʎə. ʎə is used with nouns that are closer to the speaker, while kʷə is used for nouns which are more distant. These articles do not reflect a gender of a noun and both articles have been found in use for the same noun in discourse.
Verbs have intransitive, imperfect, and perfect marker. Verbs which are intransitive take the -u suffix, while the imperfect tense takes the -ʔi suffix and the perfect tense takes the -t suffix.

Gender, Number, Person
Miluk does not have a masculine/feminine gender distinction, but it does have reflexives of an old gender system. The language reflects this old system in two instances: with a suffix that follows articles (-č) and in lexical items for male and female people throughout life. The suffix -č has been seen to be optional but occurs in three instances: (i) following a feminine noun, (ii) referring to a young person, and (the most common) (iii) referring to elders. The second place where Miluk holds on to an older gender system is when referring to males or females. Words for males often begin with /t/, while the female words often begin with /hu/ and /w/.

Miluk has no third person arguments. Presentational fronting occurs whenever a new argument is introduced.

The table below shows pronominal prefixes.

Space, Time, Modality
There are two morphemes which can be added to a verb to mark tense. The morpheme han indicates the prospective tense, which describes that an event is going to occur. The other morpheme that can be added to a verb is hanƛ, which marks the future tense. The future tense is distinguished from the prospective tense and has appeared irrealis marker a  ̆x. The order in which the morphemes appear are the pronominal clitics, followed by mood, tense and then aspect.

In the following examples, "han" indicates that an event is going to occur.

Case
Miluk has an ergative–absolutive distinction.

The suffix -x denotes the ergative case in Miluk.

In the following examples, the ergative argument comes before the absolutive argument.

Miluk allows for the opposite to occur, as we see the absolutive argument precede the ergative argument.

Predicates & Arguments

Similar to Salish languages, Miluk predicates have a tendency to be clause initial. Arguments are expressed with noun phrases and often the arguments follow the verb.
Absolutive and ergative arguments can be interchangeable.

The following example shows the ergative argument before the absolutive argument.

However, in the next example, the absolutive argument precedes the ergative argument.

Obliques
The morpheme tə marks an oblique or possessive, which occurs throughout the Salish language family. The following two example reveals -tə acting as the oblique marker.

Complements
Arguments are often fronted in Miluk and uses presentational construction. This is used while telling stories, to bring attention to the subject of the story. The following examples are of the presentational construction, with the presented construction bolded.

Endangerment
The Miluk dialect of the Coosan language is now extinct. The last speakers were two sisters, Lolly Hotchkiss and Daisy Wasson Codding. The two worked with a linguist in 1953 to record words from the language but the two were not fluent in adulthood, and had trouble remembering words. The last fluent speaker was Annie Miner Peterson, who knew both the Miluk and Hanis dialect. Annie Peterson's first language was Miluk, and in 1930, Annie Miner Peterson began working with Melville Jacobs and the two produced two volumes of texts in both dialects of Coos. Coos Narrative and Ethnographic Texts and Coos Myth Texts were the two publications were published, but the two publications did not have any linguistic analysis. The books only provided English translations to the texts.

References

Wurm, Mühlhäusler, & Tryon, 1996. Atlas of languages of intercultural communication in the Pacific, Asia and the Americas, p. 1148.

Bibliography
 Jacobs, Melville. (1939). Coos narrative and ethnologic texts. University of Washington publications in anthropology (Vol. 8, No. 1). Seattle, WA: University of Washington.
 Jacobs, Melville. (1940). Coos myth texts. University of Washington publications in anthropology (Vol. 8, No. 2). Seattle, WA: University of Washington.
 Anderson, Troy. (1990). Miluk Dictionary. Stanford Library. Green Library Stacks. PM961 .A53 1990

External links 

Coosan languages
Languages extinct in the 20th century
20th-century disestablishments in Oregon